The 1949–50 season was the forty-eighth season in which Dundee competed at a Scottish national level, playing in Division A, where the club would finish in 6th place. Dundee would also compete in both the Scottish Cup and the Scottish League Cup, but would struggle in both competitions, finishing bottom of their group in the League Cup and being knocked out in a 1st round replay against Heart of Midlothian in the Scottish Cup.

Scottish Division A 

Statistics provided by Dee Archive.

League table

Scottish League Cup 

Statistics provided by Dee Archive.

Group 2

Group 3 table

Scottish Cup 

Statistics provided by Dee Archive.

Player Statistics 
Statistics provided by Dee Archive

|}

See also 

 List of Dundee F.C. seasons

References

External links 

 1949-50 Dundee season on Fitbastats

Dundee F.C. seasons
Dundee